The siege of Hooghly was a military engagement between the Mughal army and the Portuguese garrison of fort Hooghly, the result was the capture of the fort and expulsion of the Portuguese.

Background

The Portuguese founded the town of Hooghly-Chuchura in 1579, but the district has thousands of years of heritage in the form of the great kingdom of Bhurshut. The city flourished as a trading port and some religious structures were built. One such structure is a Christian church dedicated to a statue of Mary, brought by the Portuguese.

in 1628, Shah Jahan became the new emperor of the Mughal dynasty, in the same time, news reached from Qasim khan, the governor of Bengal that the Portuguese were committing acts of piracy, smuggling, kidnapping, and the slave trade, Shahjahan resolved to curb the Portuguese acts.

Siege

In 1632, Shah Jahan ordered Qasim khan to attack the Portuguese and expel them totally. The Mughal army consisted of 150,000 men, 90 elephants, and 14,000 cavalry. In June, they arrived and besieged the fort, the Portuguese garrison consisted of only 300 Portuguese and 700 Indian converts, they also had 300 vessels, the fort was heavily fortified, they were led by Captain Manoel de Azavedo, the Portuguese held out for 3 months, the Portuguese tried to negotiate with the Sultan by offering him a huge sum of money and promised to pay tribute, but at the same time they were making a great effort to complete their war preparations to resist the Mughal army, so they prepared a division of artillery to fight the enemy. until when Mughals dug a mine and blew a portion of the walls, the Mughals swiftly entered the fort and defeated the garrison, The Mughals only lost 1000 men during the siege while the Portuguese lost 1000 men, 4000 were enslaved including women and children, all ships were captured except 3, only 3000 escaped the sack and around 10,000 native Indians were liberated.

See also
Campaign of Bassein (1693)

References 

Battles involving Portuguese India
Battles involving the Mughal Empire
Sieges involving Portugal
17th century in Portuguese India